Live at the El Rey may refer to:

 Live at the El Rey (EP), a 2006 EP by Mutemath
 Live at the El Rey (film), a concert DVD featuring comic singer-songwriter Stephen Lynch
 Live from the El Rey Theatre, a 2013 album by Jack's Mannequin

See also
 El Rey Theatre, a live music venue in Los Angeles, California